Ángel Fontane (born 21 July 1960) is a Cuban field hockey player. He competed in the men's tournament at the 1980 Summer Olympics.

References

External links
 

1960 births
Living people
Cuban male field hockey players
Olympic field hockey players of Cuba
Field hockey players at the 1980 Summer Olympics
Place of birth missing (living people)